Arch of the Sergii (Croatian: Slavoluk Sergijevaca) is an Ancient Roman triumphal arch located in Pula, Croatia. The arch commemorates three members of the Sergii family, specifically Lucius Sergius Lepidus, a tribune serving in the twenty-ninth legion that participated in the Battle of Actium and disbanded in 27 BC. This suggests an approximate date of construction: 29–27 BC. The arch stood behind the original naval gate of the early Roman colony. The Sergii were a powerful family of officials in the colony and retained their power for centuries.

History
The honorary triumphal arch, originally a city gate, was erected as a symbol of the victory at Actium. As the main inscription proclaims, it was paid for by the wife of Lepidus, Salvia Postuma Sergia. Both of their names are carved in the stone along with Lucius Sergius and Gaius Sergius, the honoree's father and uncle respectively. In its original form, statues of the two elders flanked Lepidus on both sides on the top of the arch. On either side of the inscription, a frieze  depicts cupids, garlands and bucrania. 

This small arch with pairs of crenelated Corinthian columns and winged victories in the spandrels, was built on the facade of a gate (Porta Aurea) in the walls, so the part, visible from the town-side, was decorated. The decoration is late hellenistic, with major Asia Minor influences. The low relief on the frieze represents a scene with a war chariot drawn by horses.

This arch has attracted the attention of many artists, including Michelangelo and Piranesi.

Bibliography

References

External links 

Matronly Patrons in the Early Roman Empire - the case of Salvia Postuma by Margaret L. Woodhull in Women's Influence on Classical Civilization (Routledge, 2004) [pp.75-91]
Funery Monuments - Arch of the Sergii in chapter 7 (The Pax Augusta in the West) of A History of Roman Art, Enhanced Edition (Cengage Learning, 2010) by Fred Kleiner [pp.99-100]

Sergii
Buildings and structures in Pula
27 BC
Buildings and structures completed in the 1st century BC
Archaeological sites in Croatia
Hellenistic sculpture
Tourist attractions in Pula
Stone sculptures in Croatia
Ancient Roman buildings and structures in Croatia